U-70 may refer to:

 German submarine U-70, designation of several German U-boats in the 20th century
 U-70 (synchrotron), Soviet proton synchrotron